Magnus Nilsson (2 June 1888 – 28 November 1958) was a Swedish athlete. He competed in the men's pole vault at the 1912 Summer Olympics.

References

1888 births
1958 deaths
Athletes (track and field) at the 1912 Summer Olympics
Swedish male pole vaulters
Olympic athletes of Sweden
Place of birth missing